Robin Dale Jones (February 2, 1954 – July 16, 2018) was an American professional basketball player. He played college basketball for Saint Louis.

Jones was born in St. Louis, Missouri.  He spent two seasons in the NBA, signing as a free agent with the Portland Trail Blazers in 1976.  There he came off the bench, playing in 63 games, to help the team to their first ever league title in 1977.  The following season, he moved to the Houston Rockets where he played only 12 games.  Jones then spent 5 years playing in Europe before returning to the United States where he worked in marketing for Anheuser-Busch.  In 1995, he suffered a stroke and retired from Anheuser-Busch the next year as Illinois director of marketing.

Jones died on July 16, 2018 in Chicago.

References

External links
Robin Jones Statistics - Basketball-Reference.com

1954 births
2018 deaths
African-American basketball players
American expatriate basketball people in France
American expatriate basketball people in the United Kingdom
American men's basketball players
Basketball players from St. Louis
Houston Rockets players
Portland Trail Blazers players
Power forwards (basketball)
Saint Louis Billikens men's basketball players
Undrafted National Basketball Association players
20th-century African-American sportspeople
21st-century African-American people